or Tokyo Metropolis is the capital of Japan.

Tokyo may also refer to:

Places 
 Edo, former name of Tokyo until 1868
Tokyo Prefecture, former Japanese prefecture 1868–1943 that preceded Tokyo 
Tokyo City, former city within Tokyo Prefecture 1889–1943
Special wards of Tokyo, 23 wards that cover the urban portion of Tokyo
 Greater Tokyo Area, metropolitan area that covers Tokyo and the surrounding region
Little Tokyo, Los Angeles, U.S.A

People
Tokyo Rose, generic name for female radio broadcasters of Japanese propaganda during World War II
Iva Toguri D'Aquino, American accused of being "the Tokyo Rose" after World War II
Tokyo Sexwale, South African businessman and former politician

Films
 Tokyo-Ga, a 1985 film by Wim Wenders
 Tokyo!, a 2008 film by Michel Gondry, Leos Carax, and Bong Joon-ho

Literature
 Tokyo: A View of the City, a 1999 book by Donald Richie
 Tokyo, a 2004 crime novel by British author Mo Hayder

Music
 List of songs about Tokyo
 Specific songs so titled:
 "Tokyo" (ADX song)
 "Tokyo" (Athlete song)
 "Tokyo" (Danny Saucedo song)
 "Tokyo" (Hans Vandenburg song)
 "Tokyo" (Juju song)
 "Tokyo" (Masaharu Fukuyama song)
 "Tokyo" (Yui song)
 "Tokyo", song on album A Flock of Seagulls
 "Tokyo", by Eikichi Yazawa
 "Tokyo", by Imagine Dragons, from EP It's Time
 "Tokyo", by Owl City
 "Tokyo", by The Books, from album The Lemon of Pink
 "Tokyo", performed by Yashiki Takajin
 "Tokyo", by BT on album _
 "Tokyo", by Brockhampton from Saturation II
 "Tokyo", by RM (rapper) on mixtape Mono

Other uses 
 498 Tokio, asteroid named after the city
 Tokyo, beer brand from Scottish brewers BrewDog
 Tokyō, bracketing system used in Japanese architecture
 Tokyo, fictional character from the television series Money Heist

See also
 Tokio (disambiguation)
 Tokyu (disambiguation)
 Tokyo Rose (disambiguation)
 東京 (disambiguation)
 Articles that begin with "Tokyo"